Zrze is a village in the municipality of Dolneni, North Macedonia.

Demographics
According to the statistics of Vasil Kanchov ("Macedonia. Ethnography and Statistics") from 1900, Zarze was inhabited by 400 Bulgarian Christian inhabitants.
According to the 2021 census, the village had a total of 39 inhabitants. Ethnic groups in the village include:

Macedonians 64

References

Villages in Dolneni Municipality